Competitor indexing is a price setting technique used by marketers, in which a firm pegs the prices of its products those of a competitor. This may involve matching competitors' prices, or setting prices at a fixed amount or percentage above or below. This strategy is typically used by fringe firms in industries with one or two dominant companies, and is sometimes referred to as the "follow the leader" strategy. 

Its main advantage is convenience, as extensive marketing research and statistical analysis are not required. The main disadvantage is that it is purely reactive. Price cannot be used as a variable when constructing a marketing mix: it becomes a constant over which the firm has no control.

See also 
 Pricing
 Competitor analysis
 Marketing
 Marketing mix

References

Pricing
Competition (economics)